Aegina citrea is a species of deep sea hydrozoan of the family Aeginidae.

References

Aeginidae
Animals described in 1829